The 2009 Formula BMW Europe season was the second season of Formula BMW Europe championship. The championship was contested over sixteen races at eight meetings: seven of which supported Formula One Grands Prix and a meeting at the Masters of Formula 3 event at Zandvoort. Felipe Nasr won the title at Monza, having finished fourteen of the sixteen races in the top two and won the title by 104 points. Two months after the season's finish, all results were confirmed after Mücke Motorsport's appeal over a breach of technical regulations was rejected by the FIA.

Teams and drivers
 All cars are powered by BMW engines, and Mygale FB02 chassis. Guest drivers in italics.

 Mücke Motorsport were given a four-race ban due to a force-deflection test that revealed that each oil pressure relief valve spring was of a different characteristic than the standard spring installed in the engine. They raced at Valencia and Spa under appeal, an appeal they would later lose.
† Drivers registered in other International Formula BMW series during 2009 are limited to an entry for three meetings of their choice, these Drivers will compete as Guest Drivers, they will not be entitled to receive points and prize money in the Driver classification and/or the Rookie Cup classification and/or the Team Trophy classification.

Calendar

Season schedule

Standings

Drivers
Points are awarded as follows:

† — Drivers did not finish the race, but were classified as they completed over 90% of the race distance.

Teams
Points are awarded to all eligible cars from each team as follows:

Then the total number of points scored by each Team will be divided by the number of cars from that team that entered the meeting.

Notes

References

External links
 BMW-Motorsport.com

Formula BMW seasons
Formula BMW Europe season
2009 in European sport
BMW Europe